Eleutherodactylus orientalis, the Oriental robber frog or Baracoa dwarf frog, is a species of frog in the family Eleutherodactylidae. It is endemic to the vicinity of El Yunque, Baracoa, in easternmost Cuba. Although locally common, it requires undisturbed moist forest and has a tiny range, making it critically endangered from habitat loss and degradation.

E. orientalis is relatively brightly marked in yellow and very small, females averaging  in snout–to–vent length and males . It is part of a closely related Cuban group that contains five additional described species (E. cubanus, E. etheridgei, E. iberia, E. jaumei and  E. limbatus) and at least one undescribed species; most of which are of tiny size, relatively brightly colored and possibly aposematic (at least E. iberia and E. orientalis have alkaloid toxins in their skin).

References

orientalis
Amphibians described in 1937
Endemic fauna of Cuba
Amphibians of Cuba
Taxonomy articles created by Polbot
Taxa named by Thomas Barbour
Taxa named by Benjamin Shreve